Elm Ridge is a mountain in Greene County, New York. It is located in the Catskill Mountains north of Maplecrest. Van Loan Hill is located south-southwest of Elm Ridge.

References

Mountains of Greene County, New York
Mountains of New York (state)